Jaroslavas Citavičius (March 22, 1907 – March 2, 1972) was a Lithuanian football player who played as a striker. Citavičius remains to be one of the top goal scorers for Lithuania with eight goals.

Club career 
Citavičius was a prolific striker who played for ŠŠ Kovas Kaunas and LFLS Kaunas.

International career 
Citavičius remains to one the highest scoring players for Lithuania. In the 24 appearances he made for Lithuania, he managed to score 8 goals.

References

1907 births
1972 deaths
Lithuanian footballers
Lithuania international footballers
Association football forwards